Jeon Woo-chi is a 2012 South Korean fantasy period television series, starring Cha Tae-hyun as the titular Taoist wizard who becomes an unlikely hero to the people of Joseon. It is based on the same folktale as the 2009 movie of the same name, but has a different story. Also starring Uee, Lee Hee-joon, Baek Jin-hee, Kim Kap-soo and Sung Dong-il, it aired on KBS2 from November 21, 2012 to February 7, 2013 on Wednesdays and Thursdays at 22:00 for 24 episodes.

Synopsis
In the fictional utopian nation of Yuldo, established by the righteous bandit hero Hong Gil-dong, Jeon Woo-chi is a dosa, a Taoist wizard, who gained his powers by swallowing a gumiho fox bead. A friend's betrayal causes him to lose his mentor, and sorcery turns the love of his life Hong Mu-yeon into an emotionless assassin. So in order to avenge them, he travels to Joseon, and is moved by the plight of the people and becomes a reluctant hero to them.

Cast and characters
Cha Tae-hyun as Jeon Woo-chi / Lee Chi, a mischievous, confident wizard who's always chasing women. He doesn't seem like he amounts to much, but that's all an act; he just adopts that persona so that people will underestimate him. He lives a cover life as Lee Chi, a wimpy reporter for the local newspaper who runs away at the first sign of trouble. Though he only cares about his own revenge mission, Woo-chi keeps getting entangled in the citizens’ problems. He finds it all annoying, but the more he helps, the more they start to see him as a hero. It's the last thing he wants, but perhaps a fate he can't avoid.
Uee as Hong Mu-yeon, Hong Gil-dong's granddaughter, princess of Yuldo. She learned wizardry along with Woo-chi, and is brave and strong-willed, and doesn't flinch in the face of death. Ma Sook puts her under a spell that erases her memory and controls her mind, taking her away to use her as a weapon against the Joseon people. But once a month, the energy from the moon weakens the spell, and she remembers and longs for Woo-chi.
Lee Hee-joon as Ma Kang-rim, Woo-chi's nemesis. He grew up with both Mu-yeon and Woo-chi in Yuldo. Kang-rim loved Mu-yeon, but always ended up second best in everything, including winning her heart. He chooses to betray them, setting the story in motion.
Baek Jin-hee as Lee Hye-ryung, who is searching for her brother Lee Chi. Lee Chi's been missing for some time, so when Woo-chi takes on his identity, Hye-ryung thinks she's found her long-lost oppa after all this time. Now he has to keep her fooled and thinking that he's her brother, when he's really not.
Kim Kap-soo as Ma Sook, a powerful wizard and Kang-rim's uncle. He was once a follower of Hong Gil-dong and part of the group Hwalbindang, but has betrayed Yuldo and set his sights to loftier kingdoms: He wants to conquer Joseon.
Sung Dong-il as Bong-goo, a slave of Saboksi who later becomes Jeon Woo-chi's loyal servant.
Lee Byung-joon as Woon-bo, Lee Hye-ryung's servant/guardian, a quack guru/fortune teller.
Ahn Yong-joon as Yi Geo, who ascended to the throne at a young age as the result of a coup to dethrone his half-brother the king. He once feigned utter indifference in politics as a mode of self-preservation, and even after becoming king he isn't quite able to command full authority and continues the pretending game: he has three facades he hides behind—weak, lax, and indecisive. In actuality, though, Yi Geo harbors "a grand vision for a new Joseon."
Hong Jong-hyun as Seo Chan-hwi, a member of the royal guard. He is a humorless, rule-following man of honor, and keeps trying to catch Woo-chi because he's acting outside the law.
Lee Joo-yeon as Eun-woo, a damo ("female officer") who's a skilled warrior and royal guard.
Kim Byung-se as Oh Yong
Lee Jae-yong as So-chil
Shin Seung-hwan as Dung-gae
Kim Seung-wook as Jang Sa-doo
Kim Chi-gook as Noh Joon-ik
Kim Roi-ha as Mak-gae, who is helping Hye-ryung search for her brother.
Jang Won-young as Eo Joong-yi
Park Jae-won/Shi Ho as Mong-sae
Kim Kwang-kyu as Park Myung-gi
Jo Jae-yoon as Cheol-gyeon
Jung Soo-young as Eul-yi, the innkeeper of the inn Hyeryeong and Woon-bo stayed.
Lee Dae-yeon as Policeman Moon 
Kim Byung-choon as Lee Chae-pal
Choi Deok-moon as Gye-son
Park Hae-joon as Dae-geun
Jo Ha-rang as Gam-nae, a gisaeng who works both sides of the law as an informant. 
Jang Jung-hee as Maeb-ji
Ko Joo-yeon as Kim sshi/Queen
Park Joo-young as Oh Kyu, the son of a high-ranking minister who is Lee Chi's new editor.
Kim Jae-man as Eok Chun
Kim Sang-hoon as Eop Dong
Park Gil-soo as Choi Sa-ryung
Baekho as Jang-won, a warrior ordered to safely escort Kang-rim. (cameo, ep 17)
Ren as Kang-sul, a messenger who delivered the news of a death in the palace. (cameo, ep 17)
Jung Jin-young as Jeon Woo-chi's mentor. (cameo, ep 1)

Awards and nominations

International broadcast

References

External links
 Jeon Woo-chi official KBS website 
 

Korean-language television shows
2012 South Korean television series debuts
2013 South Korean television series endings
Korean Broadcasting System television dramas
Television series set in the Joseon dynasty
South Korean historical television series
South Korean fantasy television series
Television series by Chorokbaem Media
Works based on Korean novels